Wood Knapp & Co., commonly called Wood Knapp Video or simply Wood Knapp, was a VHS distributor founded in 1988 by Betsy Wood Knapp. It distributed the Children's Circle releases from Weston Woods Studios, obscure United Artists releases, the 1988 Summer Olympics, classic teleplays such as Marty and Requiem for a Heavyweight, among others. Wood Knapp Video declared bankruptcy in January 1995, and ceased operations on December 31, 1995.

References

Home video companies of the United States

Companies based in Los Angeles
Companies that filed for Chapter 11 bankruptcy in 1995
1988 establishments in California
1995 disestablishments in California